Wang Shun (born 11 February 1994) is a Chinese competitive swimmer. A versatile medley swimmer, he became the first Asian male swimmer to win a gold medal at the men's 200m individual medley at the Olympic Games when he came in first at the 2020 Summer Olympics men's 200 metre individual medley. He is also the first swimmer from China to win a gold medal in an Olympic men's medley swimming event. He had earlier won a bronze medal in the same event at the 2016 Summer Olympics.

In addition to his Olympic medals, Wang has also won four bronze medals at the World Championships, two gold and one bronze medals at the World Championships (short course) and five medals (one gold, two silvers, two bronzes) at the Asian Games.

Wang is the current national record holder in individual medley swimming for both short and long courses in all distances (100, 200, and 400 metres). He is also the holder of the Asian record for the 200 metres individual medley.

Early and personal life
Wang Shun was born in Ningbo, Zhejiang province of China. He started swimming  at the age of 6 and entered the Zhejiang swimming team at the age of 13. Wang  is an alumnus of the School of Economics and Management at the Shanghai Jiao Tong University and the Beijing Sport University.

Career
In November 2010, at age 16, Wang first represented China at the 2010 Asian Games and won a silver medal in the men's 200m individual medley event.

In September 2011, Wang broke the Asian record when he won the men's 400m individual medley at the Chinese National Swimming Championships.

In July 2012, he made his Olympic debut at the 2012 Summer Olympics held in London, finishing 22nd in the men's 200m individual medley event. In November 2012, he won gold medals in both the men's 200m and 400m individual medley at the 2012 Asian Swimming Championships.

In April 2013, he set the national record when he won the men's 200m individual medley at the Chinese National Swimming Championships. In September 2013, he broke his own national record when he won the men's 400m individual medley at the 2013 National Games of China.

In August 2015, Wang broke his own national record when he won the bronze medal in the men's 200m individual medley at the 2015 World Championships, achieving a breakthrough for China in its men's medley swimming performance at international competitions.

In August 2016, Wang won his first Olympic medal  when he came in third in the men's 200m individual medley at the 2016 Summer Olympics. In December 2016, he won the gold medal in the men's 200m individual medley at the 2016 World Championship (SC), making it the first gold medal China has won in any international men's medley swimming event.

In July 2017, Wang won the bronze medal in the men's 200m individual medley at the 2017 World Championships, making it his second bronze medal at two consecutive World Championships.

In August 2018, Wang won his first Asian Games gold medal when he came in first in the men's 200m individual medley at the 2018 Asian Games.

In July 2021, Wang won his first Olympic gold medal when he came in first at the men's 200m individual medley at the 2020 Summer Olympics, setting a new Asian record with his timing of 1:55.00, making him the second male swimmer from China to win an Olympic gold medal after Sun Yang. This is also the first gold medal won by an Asian male swimmer in the Olympics men's 200m individual medley event, and the first gold medal won by a Chinese male swimmer in any medley swimming event at the Olympics.

In September 2021, Wang bagged 6 gold medals in the 2021 National Games of China, bringing his total gold medal tally in the National Games to 15, setting a new record for an athlete with the most number of gold medals in the history of the National Games of China   He also matched his own personal best timing in the 200 m freestyle at 1:46.14, last set 10 years ago.

Wang was named "Asian Male Swimmer of the Year" by SwimSwam for the 2021 year.

Personal bests

Long course (50-meter pool)

{| class="wikitable"
|-
!Event
!Time
!Meet
!Date
!Note(s)
|-
| 50 m freestyle
| 24.99
| 2013 World Championships
| August 2, 2013
|
|-
| 100 m freestyle
| 49.47
| 2020 Chinese National Swimming Championships
| September 30, 2020
|
|-
| 200 m freestyle
| 1:46.14
| 2011 Chinese City Games  2021 National Games of China
| October 17, 2011  September 21, 2021
|
|-
| 1500 m freestyle
| 14:56.92
| 2011 Chinese City Games
| October 17, 2011
|
|-
| 50 m backstroke
| 25.59
| 2019 World Cup
| August 9, 2019
|
|-
| 100 m backstroke
| 54.09 
| 2023 Chinese Spring National Championships
| March 19, 2023
|
|-
| 200 m backstroke
| 1:58.68
| 2015 World Cup
| August 12, 2015
|
|-
| 50 m breastsroke
| 31.21
| 2015 World Cup
| September 29, 2015
|
|-
| 100 m breaststroke
| 1:04.05
| 2011 Chinese National Swimming Championships
| September 21, 2011
|
|-
| 200 m breaststroke
| 2:16.30
| 2012 Chinese National Swimming Championships
| September 22, 2012
|
|-
| 50 m butterfly
| 24.78
| 2020 Tokyo Olympics
| July 30, 2021
|
|-
| 100 m butterfly
| 52.83
| 2020 Chinese National Swimming Championships
| September 28, 2020
|
|-
| 200 m butterfly
| 1:56.70
| 2013 Chinese National Swimming Championships
| April 4, 2013
|
|-
| 200 m individual medley
| 1:55.00
| 2020 Tokyo Olympics
| July 30, 2021
|AS,NR
|-
| 400 m individual medley
| 4:09.10| 2013 National Games of China
| September 4, 2013
|NR|}

Short course (25-meter pool)Key''': NR = National Record ; AS = Asian Record

References

1994 births
Living people
Chinese male backstroke swimmers
Chinese male medley swimmers
Swimmers from Zhejiang
Swimmers at the 2012 Summer Olympics
Swimmers at the 2016 Summer Olympics
Swimmers at the 2020 Summer Olympics
Olympic swimmers of China
Asian Games medalists in swimming
Swimmers at the 2010 Asian Games
Swimmers at the 2014 Asian Games
Swimmers at the 2018 Asian Games
World Aquatics Championships medalists in swimming
Medalists at the 2016 Summer Olympics
Medalists at the 2020 Summer Olympics
Olympic gold medalists for China
Olympic bronze medalists for China
Olympic gold medalists in swimming
Olympic bronze medalists in swimming
Medalists at the FINA World Swimming Championships (25 m)
Asian Games gold medalists for China
Asian Games silver medalists for China
Asian Games bronze medalists for China
Medalists at the 2010 Asian Games
Medalists at the 2014 Asian Games
Medalists at the 2018 Asian Games
Sportspeople from Ningbo
21st-century Chinese people